Orites is a genus of 9 known species, 7 endemic to Australia (4 of which occur in Tasmania) and 2 in South America; 1 in the Chilean Andes and 1 in Bolivia.

Species
This listing was sourced from the Australian Plant Name Index and other scholarly sources:

 Orites acicularis , Yellow bush – Tasmania, Australia
 Orites diversifolia , Variable orites – Tasmania, Australia
 Orites excelsus , Mountain silky oak, prickly ash, white beefwood, southern silky oak, siky oak – NSW and Qld, Australia
 Orites fiebrigii – Bolivia
 Orites lancifolius , Alpine orites – NSW, ACT and Victoria, Australia
 Orites megacarpus  - endemic to mountains of NE. Qld, Australia
 Orites milliganii , Toothed orites – Tasmania, Australia
 Orites myrtoidea – Chile
 Orites revolutus  – Tasmania, Australia

Formerly included here, and awaiting the Australian Plant Census update of the new name to the accepted species names
 Orites sp. Devils Thumb (P.I.Forster + PIF10720) / (Pinnacle Rock Track WWC 867)  ⇒  Hollandaea diabolica  – endemic to a restricted area in the Wet Tropics rainforests of NE. Qld, Australia

References

 
Proteaceae genera
Proteales of Australia